Botyodes andrinalis is a species of moth of the family Crambidae described by Pierre Viette in 1958. It is found in Madagascar.

Its wingspan is 48–55 mm, with a length of the forewings of 23–27 mm. The males are smaller than the females.
The holotype had been collected near Périnet (Analamazoatra Reserve).

References

Moths described in 1958
Spilomelinae
Moths of Madagascar
Moths of Africa